Lucas Cristián Moya (born 1 February 1987) is an Argentine football midfielder who plays for Central Córdoba.

Career
Moya made his professional debut for Rosario Central on 26 August 2005 in a 4-0 home win against Lanús. He played two further games as an 18-year-old during 2005. He then played in the reserves until Apertura 2009 where he established himself as a regular player in the first team.

References

External links
 
 
 

1987 births
Living people
People from Catamarca Province
Argentine footballers
Association football midfielders
Rosario Central footballers